Ardagh is a toponymic surname, from the Irish place name Ardagh (from Irish Gaelic ard áth, "high field"). Notable people with the surname include:

Catherine Ardagh, Irish politician
Dick Ardagh (1871–1931), Australian politician
John Ardagh (1928–2008), British writer
John Charles Ardagh (1840–1907), British Army officer
Osmond Ardagh (1900–1954), English cricketer
Philip Ardagh (born 1961), British writer
Seán Ardagh (1947–2016), Irish politician
William Davis Ardagh (1828–1893), Canadian politician